Andrew Rollo, 5th Lord Rollo, (18 November 1703, Duncrub – 20 June 1765, Leicester) was a Scottish army commander in Canada and Dominica during the Seven Years' War, who led the British land forces in the capture of Dominica on 6 June 1761.

Life
Lord Rollo was the son of Robert Rollo, 4th Lord Rollo (c. 1680–1758) and Mary Roll, daughter to Sir Henry Rollo of Woodside.

He was commissioned into the army at the age of forty in order to fight during the War of the Austrian Succession he fought at the Battle of Dettingen in 1743, being promoted to Major in June 1750, and by 1756 he commanded the 22nd Regiment of Foot.

Seven Years' War

During the Seven Years' War, he was fighting since 1757 for the British in the Americas . He saw action in New York, Cape Breton Island, Sorel and Montreal. He led the Île Saint-Jean Campaign, which resulted in the capture of Prince Edward Island in 1758 and deportation of the French Acadians there. A bay on the island is still named after him. In 1760 he was raised to the rank of brigadier general.

On 3 May 1761 he sailed with his regiment from New York to the West Indies where he commanded the land forces at the attack on the French settlement of Roseau on 6 June, which he took with a force of only 2,500 men. After the capture he was made Commander-in-Chief of Dominica before the island was definitely ceded to Britain by the terms of the Treaty of Paris in 1763. During this period he took a prominent part in the British capture of Martinique and in the British expedition against Cuba in 1762.

His health was severely affected by the climate, and he returned to England in 1762, dying at Leicester in 1765. He was interred at St Margaret's church in that city.

Marriage and issue
He married on 24 April 1727, with Catherine Murray (died 28 July 1763), daughter of Lord James Murray, and had 2 children:

 Anna Rollo (1729–1746)
 John Rollo, Master of Rollo (1736–1762)

He remarried on 16 February 1765 to Elizabeth Moray and died 4 months later.

As his only son had died before him, he was succeeded by his brother John Rollo.

Legacy
On Dominica, his name was given to Rollo's Head which had been called Pointe Ronde by the French, but the French name is still more commonly used today. His name was also given to Rollo Street in what was to be the British capital of Dominica at Portsmouth, and this street name still survives.  Rollo Bay, Prince Edward Island is also named after him.

References

Notes

Sources
 Balfour Paul, Sir J., Scots Peerage IX vols. Edinburgh 1904.

External links
 News Dominica
 Scottish clans

1703 births
1765 deaths
British Army generals
British Army personnel of the French and Indian War
Lords of Parliament
British Army personnel of the War of the Austrian Succession
Cheshire Regiment officers
People from Perth and Kinross
Governors of Dominica